His Grace and Her Grace are English styles of address used with high rank personages, and was the style used to address English monarchs until Henry VIII (r. 1509–1547), and for addressing Scottish monarchs until the Act of Union of 1707, which united the Kingdom of Scotland and the Kingdom of England.

In the British Isles, Your Grace (and His Grace or Her Grace) are styles of address used for archbishops, dukes, and duchesses; e.g. His Grace the Duke of Norfolk and His Grace the Lord Archbishop of Canterbury. The correct style is "Your Grace" in spoken and written address; as a stylistic descriptor for British dukes the style of address is an abbreviation of the full, formal style: "The Most High, Noble and Potent Prince His Grace". 

However, a royal duke, such as Prince Edward, Duke of Kent, is addressed as Your Royal Highness.

Ecclesiastical usage

Christianity
The style "His Grace" and "Your Grace" is used in England and some other English-speaking countries to address Roman Catholic archbishops whose seats have come from an English Diocesan Background, which is not common in other countries (e.g. in France, the Philippines, and the United States Catholic bishops are addressed using the style "Excellency"). In the Eastern Orthodox Church it is used for bishops and abbots. The style is also used for an archbishop and some bishops in the Anglican tradition. In Ireland, the style "His/Your Grace" is traditionally used for all Catholic bishops, not just archbishops. In the United Methodist Church in the United States, bishops are addressed "Your Grace" (spoken style), and "His/Her Grace" (reference style).   The Church of God in Christ addresses its Presiding Bishop as "His Holy Grace" and "Your Holy Grace". The title solely for Roman Catholic Cardinals in reference style is "His Eminence" and the spoken style is "Your Eminence".

"Your Grace" is also an alternative style for the Archbishops of Canterbury and York in the Church of England and the Lord High Commissioner to the General Assembly of the Church of Scotland.

Other religions
In Islam, several Sufi orders (such as the Qadrianis and Hawariyun) may refer to their spiritual Grand Masters with the epithet "(Most) Gracious ..." or "His Grace" in reference style while the spoken style is "(Most) Gracious".

International Society for Krishna Consciousness (ISKCON–Hare Krishna) devotees prefix the name of their founder, A. C. Bhaktivedanta Swami Prabhupada, with "His Divine Grace".

Fictional usage
In the fantasy world of A Song of Ice and Fire / Game of Thrones, it is the style used in Westeros to address and refer to kings and queens.

See also
 Style of the monarchs of Scotland
 By the Grace of God
 Forms of address in the United Kingdom

References

Styles (forms of address)
Royal styles